Seventy-one bowlers have taken a wicket with the very first ball they bowled in one of the three formats of international cricket. Twenty bowlers have performed this feat in Test cricket.  The first was Australian Tom Horan, who dismissed Walter Read with his first ball on 26 January 1883, and the most recent is South Africa bowler Hardus Viljoen who dismissed the England captain Alastair Cook on 15 January 2016. Seven of these twenty bowlers have been English cricketers. However, this accomplishment has not always led to a long and illustrious career. Only Maurice Tate, Intikhab Alam and Nathan Lyon went on to play in more than ten Tests. Arthur Coningham, Matt Henderson, Dennis Smith, and Tyrell Johnson were One-Test wonders, and Smith's only Test wicket was the one he took with his first ball.

In One Day International (ODI) matches, twenty-nine bowlers have taken a wicket with their first ball. The first to accomplish this was English bowler Geoff Arnold, who bowled Graeme Watson on 24 August 1972. The most recent is Keemo Paul, from West Indies, who struck with his debut delivery on 15 March 2018. Not all of these bowlers took their first wicket in their debut match. Clive Lloyd, Inzamam-ul-Haq, Sadagoppan Ramesh, and Martin van Jaarsveld did not bowl in their debut matches, and took their first wicket on a later appearance. Ramesh and Wavell Hinds took their first wickets during the same match on 6 September 1999; the former in the first innings of the match and the latter in the second. It was also the only wicket taken by Ramesh during his ODI career.

In Twenty20 International (T20I) cricket, twenty-two bowlers, including two women, have taken a wicket with their first ball.  The first to achieve this feat was Australian Michael Kasprowicz who took wickets with his first and second delivery in this format on 17 May 2005, dismissing New Zealand's Stephen Fleming and Mathew Sinclair. Hong Kong's Nadeem Ahmed and Nepal's Paras Khadka took their first wickets during the same match on 16 March 2014; the former in the first innings of the match and the latter in the second.

Key

Wicket with first ball in Test career

Wicket with first ball in ODI career

Wicket with first ball in T20I career

Wicket with first ball in women's T20I career

Notes

References

External links

Cricket-related lists
Wicket